Chief William Jeffrey (born 1899, date of death unknown) was a Canadian hereditary Tsimshian Chief, First Nations activist and carver. He attended residential school from 1914 to 1917. Though he desired to be a lawyer, his status as a First Nations person and government policy at the time prevented him from attending college for any profession other than the clergy.

In 1930 he co-founded the Native Brotherhood of British Columbia. "The NBBC advocated improvements to the level of education among Aboriginal peoples, greater recognition in law of their hunting, fishing and logging rights, and the decriminalization of the potlatch."(Treaty Talks in British Columbia: Negotiating a Mutually Beneficial Future p. 25) In 1940 he appeared in the House of Commons to further those aims, also delivering the message:

In 1953, attracted by the message of "peace and justice to peoples of all races, nationalities, creeds and colors," Jeffrey left behind his political pursuits to become a minister of Jehovah's Witnesses.

In 1960 he began carving totem poles and replicas of totem poles, joining a movement to revive the practice of Northwest Coast art once banned in British Columbia. Many of his poles still stand in Prince Rupert and even Adelaide Australia.

Jeffrey was a native speaker of Smalgyax, a Tsimshian language. He also spoke English and Chinook Jargon.

See also
List of First Nations people

References

External links
 Totem Poles

1899 births
Year of death missing
20th-century First Nations people
First Nations history in British Columbia
Indigenous leaders in British Columbia
People from Lax Kw'alaams
Tsimshian woodcarvers